Ligron is a commune in the Sarthe department in the region of Pays de la Loire in north-western France. Ligron was famous for its pottery ovens from the 13th century which were still in use until the late 19th century.

Sights
Church of Sainte-Maire-and-Saint-Anne  (12th, 16th and 17th century).
Manor House La Sansonniere (13th, 17th and 19th century).

Population

See also
Communes of the Sarthe department

References

Communes of Sarthe